John Dockery (September 6, 1944) is an American sportscaster and former American football defensive back who played for the New York Jets and later the Pittsburgh Steelers from 1968 to 1973. He graduated from Brooklyn Preparatory a Jesuit High School where he lettered in football, basketball, and baseball. He was signed as an undrafted free agent by the Jets out of Harvard. He spent the last two years of his playing career with the Steelers.

In 1965, he played collegiate summer baseball for the now defunct Sagamore Clouters of the Cape Cod Baseball League. A first-baseman, Dockery played alongside future major league manager Bob Schaefer under Clouters' manager Lou Lamoriello, who skippered the team to the 1965 league title.

Following his retirement, Dockery went on to co-host Sports Extra on WNYW Channel 5 in New York City with Bill Mazer. He also served as a color analyst for College Football on ABC and NFL on CBS telecasts as well as a sideline reporter for College Football on CBS and Notre Dame Football on NBC.

Dockery served as a sideline reporter for Monday Night Football broadcasts on Westwood One radio from 1999 to 2007. Prior to that, he served as analyst for the network's Sunday Night Football radiocasts, as well as sideline reporter for other games.

Dockery continues to serve the game of football by co-organizing a youth football camp with Joe Namath that is in this 44th year. Additionally after his sports career Dockery founded Cambridge Corporate Services in 1998, a New York-based outsourcing service provider.

See also

Other American Football League players

References

External links
Full roster of all American Football League players 1960 - 1969
Joe Namath / John Dockery Football Camp
Cambridge Corporate Services

1944 births
Living people
American football cornerbacks
College football announcers
Harvard Crimson football players
National Football League announcers
Television anchors from New York City
New York Jets announcers
New York Jets players
Sportspeople from Brooklyn
Players of American football from New York City
Pittsburgh Steelers players
New York Stars players
Olympic Games broadcasters
Tennis commentators
College basketball announcers in the United States
American Football League players
Bourne Braves players